Cornelis Wilhelmus Pieter "Cor" Vriend (born 8 November 1949) is a former long-distance runner from the Netherlands, who mainly competed in the marathon. He participated in two consecutive Summer Olympics for his native country; in 1980 (Moscow, 41st place) and 1984 (Los Angeles, 39th place). During the early 1980s he was overshadowed by his fellow countryman Gerard Nijboer.

Vriend twice won the Amsterdam Marathon, in 1983 and 1984. He also won the Enschede Marathon in 1981 and the Beppu-Ōita Marathon in Japan in 1984. He is the Dutch record holder for the relatively obscure 25,000 m and 30,000 m track events, both of which he set on 22 August 1981.

His personal best at the marathon was 2:11:41, set at the 1984 Maassluis Marathon, finishing first in the race.

Achievements

References

External links
 
 

1949 births
Living people
Dutch male long-distance runners
Dutch male marathon runners
Olympic athletes of the Netherlands
Athletes (track and field) at the 1980 Summer Olympics
Athletes (track and field) at the 1984 Summer Olympics
Sportspeople from Eindhoven